D. Oyuntulhuur (born 10 November 1975) better known by the stage name Oyunaa, is a Mongolian singer based in Japan.

Oyunaa won the Grand Prix at the World Children's Music Festival in Tokyo in 1989. In 1996, Oyunaa returned to Ulaanbaatar to play a benefit concert at the Central Cultural Palace, raising more than $70,000 for homeless children, single parents, low-income families, and spring fire and flood victims.

References

1975 births
Living people
21st-century Mongolian women singers
Mongolian expatriates in Japan